Martine Olivier is a French former ice dancer. With Yves Tarayre, she is the 1976 World Junior bronze medalist and 1979 French national champion. They trained in Châlons-en-Champagne. In mid-1979, Olivier teamed up with Philippe Boissier, with whom she competed at three World Championships and two European Championships. She retired from competition in 1985.

Competitive highlights

With Tarayre

With Boissier

References 

French female ice dancers
Living people
People from Châlons-en-Champagne
World Junior Figure Skating Championships medalists
Sportspeople from Marne (department)
Year of birth missing (living people)